The Brian Award (in Italian: Premio Brian) is the award given since 2006 to “a film that highlights and enhances the values of rationality, respect for human rights, democracy, pluralism, promotion of individuality, freedom of conscience, expression and research, the principle of equal opportunities in public institutions for all citizens, without the frequent distinctions based on sex, gender identity, sexual orientation, religious or philosophical stands” among those presented during the Venice International Film Festival.

History
The "Brian Award" was inspired by the name of the Monty Python's satire movie Life of Brian.
The prize consists of a golden globe with glass balls inside, a work of the Italian artist-jeweler Giovanni Corvaja.
The award was established by the Italian Union of Rationalist Atheists and Agnostics (Member of the IHEU, the International Humanist and Ethical Union (IHEU) and European Humanist Federation (EHF) (in which UAAR represents Italy).

Awards

References 

Italian film awards